Amore del Tropico is the fourth studio album by the American indie rock band The Black Heart Procession.  It was released on October 8, 2002, on Touch and Go Records.

Track listing 
 "The End of Love" - 0:12
 "Tropics of Love" - 4:56
 "Broken World" - 4:33
 "Why I Stay" - 3:30
 "The Invitation" - 3:55
 "Did You Wonder" - 2:54
 "A Sign on the Road" - 3:49
 "Sympathy Crime" - 4:24
 "The Visitor" - 5:03
 "The Waiter #4" - 3:32
 "A Cry for Love" - 6:12
 "Before the People" - 2:53
 "Only One Way" - 3:11
 "Fingerprints" - 2:57
 "The One Who Has Disappeared" - 3:33

References

2002 albums
The Black Heart Procession albums
Touch and Go Records albums